Phoenix Club was a historic clubhouse located at Terre Haute, Vigo County, Indiana. It was built in 1905, and was a two-story, rectangular, Renaissance Revival style pressed brick building with limestone detailing.  It was built to house the Phoenix Club, a Jewish men's organization. It later housed the Central Labor Union of Vigo County. It has been demolished.

It was listed on the National Register of Historic Places in 1983 and delisted in 1993.

References

Former National Register of Historic Places in Indiana
Clubhouses on the National Register of Historic Places in Indiana
Renaissance Revival architecture in Indiana
Buildings and structures completed in 1905
Buildings and structures in Terre Haute, Indiana
National Register of Historic Places in Terre Haute, Indiana
1905 establishments in Indiana